The Embassy of Palestine in Cairo is the diplomatic mission of Palestine in Egypt. It is located at 24 Al Nahda Street in Dokki, Cairo.

Ambassadors

See also

List of diplomatic missions in Egypt.
List of diplomatic missions of Palestine.

References

Egypt
Palestine
Egypt–State of Palestine relations